St. Joseph's Secondary School (SJSS) or St. Joseph's Catholic Secondary School (SJCSS) is a separate (publicly funded Catholic) secondary school in Cornwall, Ontario, Canada. Falling under the jurisdiction of the Catholic District School Board of Eastern Ontario, it shares its building with the newly amalgamated Sacred Heart Catholic School and grade 7-8 wing (where General Vanier Intermediate School was previously housed).

History

Bishop Macdonell Catholic Secondary School first opened on September 6, 1983 with fifty-nine students, sharing a building with Bishop Macdonell Senior Elementary School.  In September 1985, after the separate school system was implemented, the school was renamed to St. Joseph's Secondary School by Percy Beaudette, and moved to its present location. The school initially educated Grades 9, 10 and 11 students, with Grade 12 added in September 1986 and Grade 13/OAC courses added in September 1987. In September 1993, the school was expanded to its current size and layout. In the summer of 2018, the renovation of the closed General Vanier Intermediate School  took place to include a separate grade 7-8 wing in  St. Joseph due to area elementary schools switching to a K-6 program or being consolidated.

Academics
St. Joseph's offers courses in accordance with Ontario's secondary school curriculum. Being a Catholic school, religion courses are mandatory in grades 9-12. However, according to the 
Ontario Education Act
R.S.O. 1990, CHAPTER E.2  43 (13). Students may be exempt from religion course, provided the parents notify the school in writing.

The Ontario Superior Court has ruled that student at a Catholic high school who is entitled to be excused from religious courses must also be excused, if they wish, from religious field trips and attending mass.

In addition, Specialist High Skill Majors (SHSM) are offered in Automotive, Business and Hospitality to provide students with certifications.

Athletics

St. Joseph's offers a full co-curricular athletic programme. Each year, a full slate of teams compete against other independent schools in the Eastern Ontario Secondary Schools Athletic Association (EOSSAA). St. Joseph's competitive sports teams are known as the "Panthers".

External links

 Official site
 Catholic District School Board of Eastern Ontario

Catholic secondary schools in Ontario
High schools in Cornwall, Ontario
Educational institutions established in 1983
1983 establishments in Ontario